Cheilea is a genus of small limpet-like sea snails, marine gastropod mollusks in the family Hipponicidae, the hoof snails.

Species
Species within the genus Cheilea include:
 Cheilea africana Rolán & Fernández-Garcés, 2014
 Cheilea americana Rolán, Redfern & Fernández-Garcés, 2014
 Cheilea atlantica Rolán, Leal & Fernández-Garcés, 2014
 Cheilea cepacea (Broderip, 1834)
 Cheilea cicatricosa (Reeve, 1858)
 Cheilea corrugata (Broderip, 1834)
 Cheilea dormitoria (Reeve, 1858)
 Cheilea equestris (Linnaeus, 1758)
 Cheilea hipponiciformis (Reeve, 1858)
 † Cheilea janitrix Maxwell, 1966 
 Cheilea microstriata Barnard, 1963
 † Cheilea plumea Laws, 1932
 † Cheilea postera Laws, 1936 
 Cheilea scutulum (Reeve, 1858)
 Cheilea striata Nowell-Usticke, 1959
 Cheilea tectumsinense (Lamarck, 1822)
 Cheilea tortilis  (Reeve, 1858)
 Cheilea uncinata (Reeve, 1858)
 Cheilea undulata (Röding, 1798)
Species brought into synonymy
 Cheilea papyracea: synonym of Cheilea equestris (Linnaeus, 1758)
 Cheilea porosa Reeve, 1858 : synonym of Cheilea equestris (Linnaeus, 1758)

References

External links

Malacolog list of Western Atlantic species

Hipponicidae